Chachapoyas Airport , is an airport serving the city of Chachapoyas in the Amazonas Region of Peru. The runway is on a mesa north of the city, with steep dropoffs on either end.

The Chachapoyas VOR-DME (Ident: POY) is located on the field.

Airlines and destinations 

The following airline serves the airport:

Accidents and incidents
On January 9, 2003, TANS Perú Flight 222 crashed into a mountain while attempting to land in Chachapoyas. All 46 passengers aboard the Fokker F-28 died.

See also
Transport in Peru
List of airports in Peru

References

External links 
Chachapoyas Airport
OurAirports - Chachapoyas
OpenStreetMap - Chachapoyas
SkyVector Aeronautical Charts

Airports in Peru
Buildings and structures in Amazonas Region